Les Valls de Valira is a municipality in the comarca of the Alt Urgell in Catalonia, that surrounds the south and south-west border of Andorra. It includes a small exclave to the south-east.

Landmarks
Sant Serni de Tavèrnoles

References

External links
 Government data pages 

Municipalities in Alt Urgell